Harrison School District 36 is a school district located in Wonder Lake, Illinois, United States. The district operates one school, educating about 400 students from Kindergarten to grade 8.

References

External links

School districts established in 1854
School districts in McHenry County, Illinois
1854 establishments in Illinois